Notidobia is a genus of insects belonging to the family Sericostomatidae.

The species of this genus are found in Europe and Northern America.

Species:
 Notidobia bizensis (Malicky & Sipahiler, 1993) 
 Notidobia ciliaris (Linnaeus, 1761)

References

Integripalpia
Trichoptera genera